The Hyundai Lambda engine family is the company's all-aluminium V6 engine manufactured since 2005. It is currently manufactured at Hyundai's plant in Asan, South Korea. It used to be manufactured at HMMA plant in Montgomery, Alabama, United States. All versions of this engine use a timing chain.

Lambda MPi
This engine family uses aluminium blocks and heads, variable valve timing on the intake side, and 4 valves per cylinder.

3.3L (G6DB)

The  Lambda MPi G6DB version was introduced with the 2005 Sonata.

Applications:
2006–2008 Hyundai Azera (TG)
2007–2009 Hyundai Santa Fe (CM)
2005–2008 Hyundai Sonata (NF)
2007–2009 Kia Opirus
2005–2009 Kia Sorento (BL)

3.8L (G6DA)

Applications:
2005–2008 Hyundai Azera (TG)
2007–2009 Hyundai Entourage
2007–2008 Hyundai Centennial/Equus (YJ)
2007–2013 Hyundai Veracruz
2005–2010 Kia Amanti/Opirus
2005–2010 Kia Carnival/Sedona (VQ)
2007–2009 Kia Sorento (BL)

Lambda II MPi
Changes to Lambda MPi series include adding a CVVT on the exhaust side as well, therefore it does have Dual CVVT.

3.0L (G6DE)

Applications:
 2012–2019 Hyundai Azera

3.3L (G6DB)

3.3L (G6DF)

Applications (G6DB/G6DF):
 2009–2011 Hyundai Azera (TG)
 2012–2018 Hyundai Santa Fe (DM)
 2013–2018 Hyundai Grand Santa Fe (NC)
 2008–2009 Hyundai Sonata (NF)
 2016–2019 Kia Cadenza (YG)
 2010–2012 Kia Opirus
 2014–2020 Kia Sorento (UM)

3.5L (G6DC)
The  Lambda II MPi  G6DC Lambda II version debuted in the global version of the 2011 Kia Sorento. Bore x stroke measure ; it uses similar technology as the 3.3L and 3.8L variants of the Lambda family.

Applications:
 2017–2022 Hyundai Azera (IG)
 2018–present Hyundai Palisade
 2010–2012 Hyundai Santa Fe (CM)
 2018–2020 Hyundai Santa Fe (TM)
 2011–2016 Kia Cadenza (VG)
 2020–2021 Kia Cadenza (YG)
 2011–2014 Kia Carnival (VQ)
 2011–2020 Kia Sorento

3.8L (G6DA)

Applications:
 2011 Hyundai Azera (TG)
 2008–2014 Kia Borrego/Mohave
 2010–2012 Kia Opirus

Lambda II GDi
This engine series includes Dual CVVT and GDI.

Hyundai debuted a GDI version of Lambda V6 at 2010 Beijing Auto Show.

3.0L (G6DG)
The  Lambda II GDi G6DG version released with the Azera/Grandeur 5th generation.

Applications:
 2012–2016 Hyundai Grandeur/Azera (HG)
 2011–2016 Kia K7 (VG)

3.0L (G6DL)
The 3.0L G6DL is the newer variant of the 3.0L GDI engine.

Applications:
 2016–2019 Hyundai Grandeur/Azera (IG)
 2018–2021 Kia K7 (YG)

3.3L (G6DH)
The 3.3L G6DH version was introduced with the fifth generation Grandeur/Azera.

Applications:
 2011–2016 Hyundai Grandeur/Azera (HG)
 2012–2018 Hyundai Santa Fe (DM)
 2013–2018 Hyundai Maxcruz/Grand Santa Fe/Santa Fe XL (NC)
 2011–2016 Kia Cadenza (VG)
 2014–2018 Kia Carnival (YP)
 2014–2020 Kia Sorento (UM)

3.3L (G6DM)
The 3.3L G6DM is the newer variant of the 3.3L GDI engine.

Applications:
 2016–2022 Hyundai Grandeur/Azera (IG)
 2016–2021 Kia Cadenza (YG)
 2018–2020 Kia Carnival (YP)

3.8L (G6DN)
The 3.8L Atkinson cycle version was introduced with the Hyundai Palisade and Kia Telluride.

Applications:
 2018–present Hyundai Palisade
 2019–present Kia Telluride

Lambda II RS MPi
The Lambda II RS (Rear-drive Sport) designation denotes longitudinal Lambda engine variants.

3.3L (G6DB)

Applications:
 2008–2011 Hyundai Genesis (BH)

3.8L (G6DA/G6DK)

The engine is all-aluminium, featuring DOHC, Dual CVVT and 24 valves.

Applications:
 2009–2011 Hyundai Equus (VI)
 2008–2011 Hyundai Genesis (BH)
 2009–2015 Hyundai Genesis Coupe
 2013–2018 Kia K9 (KH)
 2013–2017 Oulim Spirra CregiT

Lambda II RS GDi
Hyundai released a GDI variant of the Lambda RS engine for the 2012 Genesis and 2013 Genesis Coupe.

3.0L (G6DG)

Applications:
 2013–2016 Hyundai Genesis

3.3L (G6DH)

Applications:
 2016–2020 Genesis G80 (DH)
 2011–2016 Hyundai Genesis
 2012–2018 Kia K9 (KH)

3.3L (G6DM)

Applications:
 2018–2021 Kia K9 (RJ)

3.8L (G6DJ/G6DN)
The  version compression ratio is 11.5:1 and power output varies depending on configuration.
It produces:

Applications:
 2016–2020 Genesis G80 (DH)
 2015–2021 Genesis G90 (HI)
 2011–2015 Hyundai Equus (VI)
 2011–2016 Hyundai Genesis
 2011–2016 Hyundai Genesis Coupe
 2012–Present Kia K9

Lambda II RS T-GDi

3.3L (G6DP)

It is a version of Lambda II GDi 3.3 engine with two turbochargers.

Applications:
2017–present Genesis G70
2016–2020 Genesis G80 (DH)
2015–2021 Genesis G90 (HI)
2018–present Kia K9 (RJ)
2017–2023 Kia Stinger

Lambda II LPi
Modified Lambda engine that includes support for LPI injection instead.

3.0L (L6DB)

Applications:
2011–2022 Hyundai Grandeur
2011–2021 Kia K7

Modified race engines
Rhys Millen Racing (RMR) has developed a  version of the Lambda II RS MPi engine in an attempt to break the Pikes Peak International Hill Climb (PPIHC) record. The race-version is reported to have been bored and stroked to 4.1 liters of swept displacement with an added turbocharger to increase power output.

Crate engines
On 5 November 2013, Hyundai announced the creation of a new factory crate engine program at the 2013 SEMA Show in Las Vegas, which initially included a Lambda 3.8-liter, direct-injected V6 engine. The crate engine program began in December 2013.

References

See also
 List of Hyundai engines

Lambda
V6 engines
2005 introductions
Gasoline engines by model